The Broadway Peacock is a 1922 American silent drama film directed by Charles Brabin and starring Pearl White, Joseph Striker and Doris Eaton.

Cast
 Pearl White as Myrtle May
 Joseph Striker as Harold Van Tassel
 Doris Eaton as Rose Ingraham
 Harry Southard as Jerry Gibson
 Elizabeth Garrison as Mrs. Van Tassel

References

Bibliography
Parish, James Robert & Pitts, Michael R. . Film Directors: A Guide to their American Films. Scarecrow Press, 1974.

External links
 

1922 films
1922 drama films
1920s English-language films
American silent feature films
Silent American drama films
American black-and-white films
Films directed by Charles Brabin
Fox Film films
1920s American films